As an abbreviation, LLW may refer to:

Low-level waste, nuclear waste
Lilongwe International Airport (IATA airport code)
Llwyngwril railway station, Gwynedd, Wales (National Rail station code)